Colaspis arizonensis is a species of leaf beetle from North America. It is found in southeast Arizona and northwest Mexico. It was first described by the American entomologist Charles Frederic August Schaeffer in 1933.

References

Further reading

 

Eumolpinae
Articles created by Qbugbot
Beetles described in 1933
Beetles of North America
Taxa named by Charles Frederic August Schaeffer